Major League Baseball on NBC is the de facto branding for weekly broadcasts of Major League Baseball (MLB) games that are produced by NBC Sports, and televised on the NBC television network; and, as of 2022, as well as on its co-owned streaming service, Peacock.

After The Baseball Network folded after the 1995 season, NBC retained a smaller package through 2000, alternating rights to a package of postseason games with Fox (with NBC carrying the National League Championship Series and World Series in odd-numbered years, and the American League Championship Series and All-Star Game in even-numbered years).

The Comcast SportsNet regional sports networks became part of NBC Sports after Comcast acquired NBCUniversal in 2011; they currently hold rights to the Chicago White Sox, Oakland Athletics, Philadelphia Phillies, and San Francisco Giants. In 2022, NBC returned to national MLB coverage by acquiring a package of games for its streaming service Peacock.

History

From 1947 to 1956 and again in 1965, NBC only aired the All-Star Game (beginning in 1950) and World Series. From 1957 to 1989, the network aired the Saturday afternoon Game of the Week (or a variation of it prior to 1966, when NBC did not hold the exclusive over-the-air television rights). From 1994 to 1995, NBC aired games under a joint broadcasting venture with Major League Baseball and ABC called The Baseball Network. From 1996 to 2000, the network's league coverage was reduced to postseason games (three Division Series games in prime time, the American League Championship Series in even-numbered years, and the National League Championship Series and World Series in odd-numbered years), as well as the All-Star Game in even-numbered years (during years when NBC did not hold the rights to the World Series).

Attempted bid for 2007–13 
A June 4, 2006 Broadcasting & Cable article stated that Fox may have considered a partnership with another network (which ultimately, turned out to be TBS) for the next contract. NBC was the only network named in connection to a possible partnership in the article. The setup being suggested was similar to the last time NBC had the rights to baseball, that being the network would get the rights to some League Championship Series games and alternate rights to the World Series and All-Star Game with Fox, which may or may not have kept the Game of the Week. After weeks of speculation and rumors, on July 11, 2006, at the All-Star Game, Major League Baseball announced a renewal of its existing current with Fox Sports through 2013, allowing the Fox network to retain exclusivity of the television rights to the World Series and the All-Star Game (the World Series would begin the Wednesday after the League Championship Series are completed). The deal also allowed Fox to retain the Saturday Game of the Week and gave it broadcast rights to one League Championship Series annually. This ruled out baseball returning to NBC, as the two annual showpiece events were not be available in any contract the network might obtain before then.

OLN (later NBCSN) briefly considered acquiring the rights to the Sunday and Wednesday games, which expired after the 2005 season. However, on September 14, 2005, existing rightsholder ESPN signed an eight-year contract with the league, highlighted by the continuation of ESPN's Sunday Night Baseball with additional, exclusive team appearances. Currently, NBCUniversal parent Comcast owns 5.44% of the MLB Network and featured a New York Mets–San Francisco Giants game with Bob Costas and Al Michaels (who while working for the Cincinnati Reds had previously helped call the 1972 World Series for NBC and from 2006-2021, served as the play-by-play voice for NBC's Sunday Night Football telecasts) in July 2011.

The New York Times, however, reported that it was unlikely that NBC would get baseball, as the network would have to preempt up to three weeks of NFL coverage on Sunday nights. However, the NFL used to not schedule a Sunday night game on the second night of the World Series, which meant that NBC gaining the rights was not completely out of the question (however, the following Sunday, in which a possible World Series Game 7 is scheduled, a Sunday night NFL game is also scheduled). In addition to this, other Sunday playoff games, such as the ALCS and NLCS could be pushed to the afternoon. This might not be appetizing to league officials, as major playoff games would go up head-to-head against highly rated afternoon NFL games (as opposed to today's system, in which only one game out of two for the day would go up against network NFL broadcasts).

Attempted bid for 2014–21 
During the summer of 2012, NBC Sports was reportedly involved in negotiations for a television contract with Major League Baseball. NBCSN was expected to play a large part in NBC's bid. However, it was likely that NBC would want either marquee event (All-Star Game and World Series) to air on the broadcast network rather than cable. This could have potentially conflicted with the network's broadcasts of Sunday Night Football, which has generally had a game or two scheduled on nights when a World Series game is held since 2010; however, prior to this, no game was scheduled on these nights so it would not have been unprecedented. Besides the potential conflicts with Sunday Night Football, another disadvantage for NBCSN is that it was available in fewer than 80 million homes, trailing the national reach of both Fox Sports 1 and TBS.

On August 28, 2012, Major League Baseball and ESPN agreed to an eight-year, $5.6 billion contract extension, the largest broadcasting deal in Major League Baseball history. It gave ESPN the rights to up to 90 regular-season games, alternating rights to one of the two Wild Card games (between American League and National League teams) each year, and the rights to all regular-season tiebreaker games. On September 19, 2012, Sports Business Daily reported that the league would agree to separate eight-year television deals with Fox Sports and Turner Sports through the 2021 season. On October 2, 2012, the new deal between Major League Baseball and TBS was officially confirmed; NBC looked to be left without a package, because though it made an offer, Major League Baseball did not consider NBC a serious bidder after the ESPN deal was made public. Sources said that NBC did not make a strong offer, and that it was most interested in ESPN's package, which included exclusivity on Sunday night and rights to the two mid-week games. When ESPN took that package, NBC's interest waned.

MLB Sunday Leadoff on Peacock 

On June 14, 2021, NBC Sports announced that it would stream the Philadelphia Phillies and San Francisco Giants' June 18–20 series exclusively for free on NBCUniversal's streaming service Peacock. The local rights to both teams are owned by the NBC Sports Regional Networks, and the games featured a mixture of personnel from the teams' broadcasts on NBC Sports Bay Area and NBC Sports Philadelphia: the commentary team featured the Giants' Jon Miller on play-by-play, with his partner Mike Krukow, and the Phillies' John Kruk and Jimmy Rollins, serving as analysts.

Peacock would ultimately acquire a new package of 18 Sunday afternoon games from each participating team. beginning in the 2022 Major League Baseball season, branded as MLB Sunday Leadoff. Peacock's first game aired on May 8 between the Chicago White Sox and Boston Red Sox, and was also simulcast on the NBC broadcast network (marking its first MLB broadcast since 2000). It would also had officially been 7,873 days since the network last televised a Major League Baseball game.

The agreement also includes rights to the All-Star Futures Game, and an MLB content hub on Peacock with classic games and other content.

Related coverage

Major League Baseball on NBC Radio

For many years, the NBC Radio Network also had a role in Major League Baseball coverage. The network shared World Series broadcast rights with CBS beginning in 1927, with All-Star Game broadcasts added in 1933. The Mutual Broadcasting System joined NBC and CBS in 1935; the three networks continued to share coverage of baseball's "jewels" in this manner through 1938, with Mutual gaining exclusive rights to the World Series in 1939 and the All-Star Game in 1942.

In 1957, NBC replaced Mutual as the exclusive radio broadcaster for the World Series and All-Star Game. The network would continue in this role through 1975, with CBS taking over the rights the following year. NBC Radio did not air regular season games during this period (save for the three-game National League tie-breaker playoff in 1962); nor did the network cover the League Championship Series from 1969 to 1975, those series instead having local team radio broadcasts syndicated nationally over ad hoc networks.

NBC ended its radio association with baseball after the 1975 season in order to clear space for the network's 24-hour "News and Information" service programming.

Major League Baseball on NBC Sports Regional Networks

Major League Baseball coverage on NBC's owned-and-operated television stations

Even as WNBC became the first to broadcast Major League Baseball games in 1939 with the pioneer broadcast being that of an August 26 doubleheader at Ebbets Field between the Brooklyn Dodgers and the Cincinnati Reds, it does not have any local broadcasts today, with the over-the-air packages of both the New York Mets and Yankees airing on WPIX, and produced by their cable rightsholders SportsNet New York (which is partially owned by NBCUniversal) and YES Network respectively. The station has aired numerous Met (since 1962) and Yankee games (and before 1957, games of the Dodgers and Giants) as part of NBC's network coverage, including 18 of the Yankees' World Series appearances (12 of which the team won), and three Mets World Series appearances (two of which the Mets won).

KCST was home to San Diego Padres games during two different periods, first in the 1971 and 1972 seasons, and again from 1984 to 1986. The station also carried any games that were part of ABC's MLB coverage in 1976, then over to NBC's MLB broadcasts from 1977 to 1989; this included the Padres' first World Series appearance in 1984; limited postseason games involving the Padres were aired from 1995 to 2000.

KXAS (then WBAP-TV until 1974) aired Texas Rangers games as part of NBC's broadcast contract with Major League Baseball from their arrival in 1972 until 1989, and again for the postseason only from 1994 to 2000.

On November 1, 2007, KNTV entered into a three-year broadcast contract with the San Francisco Giants through 2010, replacing the team's longtime broadcaster KTVU, which had carried Giants games since 1961, three years after the team moved to the Bay Area and KTVU first began broadcasting. The team's first game broadcast on KNTV aired on April 1, 2008. KNTV broadcasts 20 to 40 Giants baseball games a year, which are produced by sister network NBC Sports Bay Area. In addition, KNTV airs Giants Clubhouse each weekend during the MLB season. All of the Giants broadcasts are carried in high definition. The station has preempted Giants telecasts during the Summer Olympics due to NBC currently holding the television rights to the Olympics. The Giants' contract with KNTV concluded at the end of the 2010 season, however, the broadcast rights were renewed prior to the 2011 season. Thus, it is one of the few major network affiliates that carry live local MLB games to viewers in their broadcast area. Despite this, it does not offer any live over-the-air broadcasts of the American League's Oakland Athletics, which are broadcast exclusively by NBC Sports California on cable.

Since Comcast acquired the WCAU's parent NBCUniversal in 2011, WCAU has aired Philadelphia's major sports teams in many years. Because of those commitments to air these major sports teams, they reschedule NBC network programs preempted on the station. WCAU, as both a CBS and NBC station, has also aired Philadelphia's pro sports teams through their network coverage as well. On January 2, 2014, Comcast and the Philadelphia Phillies announced a 25-year, $2.5 billion TV contract, including WCAU and Comcast SportsNet Philadelphia (now NBC Sports Philadelphia); although it averaged $100 million a year, it was structured to begin below the average and end above it. As part of its 25-year TV contract, WCAU took over free-to-air broadcast rights for Phillies baseball games from MyNetworkTV affiliate WPHL-TV beginning in the 2014 season, including its Opening Day game and selected games aired on the station.

Surviving telecasts

For all of the League Championship Series telecasts spanning from 1969 to 1975, only Game 2 of the 1972 American League Championship Series (Oakland vs. Detroit) is known to exist. However, the copy on the trade circuit of Game 2 of the 1972 ALCS is missing the Bert Campaneris–Lerrin LaGrow brawl. There are some instances where the only brief glimpse of telecast footage of an early LCS game can be seen in a surviving newscast from that night. For instance, the last out of the 1973 National League Championship Series as described by Jim Simpson was played on that night's NBC Nightly News, but other than that, the entire game is gone. On the day the New York Mets and Baltimore Orioles wrapped up their respective League Championship Series in 1969, a feature story on the CBS Evening News showed telecast clips of the ALCS game (there's no original sound, just voiceover narration). This is all that likely remains of anything from that third game of the Orioles–Twins series. Simpson's call of the injury of Reggie Jackson during Game 5 of the 1972 ALCS is heard on the 1972 World Series film, as well as Curt Gowdy's call of the home run by Johnny Bench in Game 5 of the 1972 NLCS as well as Bob Moose throwing a wild pitch to pinch-hitter Hal McRae scoring George Foster with the winning run.

While all telecasts of World Series games starting with 1975 are accounted for and exist, the LCS is still a spotty situation through the late 1970s:
1977 – Major League Baseball has in the vault, Game 3 of the NLCS (from the Philadelphia Phillies' local NBC affiliate) and apparently has all of Game 4 of the NLCS. Also, both the WPIX and NBC versions of Game 5 of the ALCS (both of which are also out there in terms of off-air recordings) are known to exist. Earlier games of the NLCS and ALCS have not surfaced and may not exist in the vault. Clips of these games may be seen in highlight shows or programs such as Yankeeography. It is believed that incomplete tapes of the ALCS exist. It is possible these games are not shown in part because the audio quality is poor. A common method of getting around such deficiencies would be to overlay a radio telecast or narration by a player or commentator where gaps exist.

Announcers

References

External links
 
 NBC Baseball (1983, video)
 NBC Tracer
 Searchable Network TV Broadcasts

 
NBC original programming
1947 American television series debuts
1940s American television series
1950s American television series
1960s American television series
1970s American television series
1980s American television series
1990s American television series
1989 American television series endings
1994 American television series debuts
2000 American television series endings
American television series revived after cancellation
Black-and-white American television shows